Lumphini is the transliterated Thai name of Lumbini, the birthplace of the Buddha in Nepal. It may refer to:

Lumphini Park, a public park in Bangkok
Lumphini Subdistrict in Pathum Wan District, Bangkok, covering the area around the park

See also
Lumpinee Boxing Stadium
Lumpini (film), a documentary film about professional Muay Thai boxing; see Muay Thai in popular culture
Lumbini (disambiguation)